The Twipra Kingdom (Sanskrit: Tripura, Anglicized: Tippera) was one of the largest historical kingdoms of the Tripuri people in Northeast India.

Geography
The present political areas which were part of the Twipra Kingdom are:
 Barak Valley (Cachar Plains), Hailakandi and Karimganj in present-day Assam
 Comilla, Sylhet and the Chittagong Hill Tracts in Bangladesh
 The present-day states of Tripura and Mizoram

The Twipra Kingdom in all its various ages comprised the areas with the borders:
 The Khasi Hills in the North
 The Manipur Hills in the North-East
 The Arakan Hills of Burma in the East
 The Bay of Bengal to the South
 The Brahmaputra River to the West

Legend 
A list of legendary Tripuri kings is given in the Rajmala chronicle, a 15th-century chronicle in Bengali written by the court pandits of Dharma Manikya I (r. 1431). The chronicle traces the king's ancestry to the mythological Lunar Dynasty. Druhyu, the son of Yayati, became king of the land of Kirata and constructed a city named Trivega on the bank of Kapila river. His kingdom was bounded by the river Tairang on the north, Acaranga on the south, Mekhali on the east, Koch and Vanga on the west. The daughter of the King of Hedamba was married to King Trilochona of Trivega. The King of Hedamba, having no heir, made the eldest son of Trilochona the king of his land. After the death of Trilochona, his second son Daksina became King of Tripura. Daksina shared the wealth of the kingdom among his eleven brothers. Being the eldest son of Trilochona, the King of Hedamba demanded his kingdom from his brothers. In denial, the enraged King of Hedamba attacked Tripura and destroyed the capital. The eleven brothers left Trivega and moved to Khalangma on the bank of river Varavakra and found the capital Khalangma. In the 8th century, the kingdom shifted its capital eastwards along the Surma river in Sylhet, near the present-day town of Kailasahar in northern Tripura.

The religion of the Tipra had 14 deities known as Chaturdasa Devata and is still preserved in the Chaturdasha Temple in Agartala, which is maintained by the Tipra priests known as Chantai's, who oversee the festivals of the Kharchi and Ker according to traditions.

History

Chinese chronicles
Twipra is mentioned in Ming Shilu as Di-wu-la. By the early 15th century, its territory was occupied by Da Gu-la, an unidentified state.

Islamic-invasions era

The earliest historical records concerning the Twipra kingdom appears in the 15th century, when it first came under pressure from the Islamic invaders. This is also the time of origin of the Manikya Dynasty, when Chhengthung Fa adopted the title Manikya, becoming Maha Manikya, with the cognomen being held by all Kings of Tripura until the death of Bir Bikram Kishore Manikya in 1947. Under Ratna Manikya I, the capital shifted to Rangamati on the banks of the river Gumti, now in South Tripura.

Tripura was one of the states that pushed back successive waves of invasions from Turks, Afghans, and Mughals. On many occasions, Tripuris (Tiprasa) also pushed back Burmese and Arakanese invasions from the East. At its height it comprised what is now Tripura, Sylhet division of Bangladesh, Cachar region of Assam state and the Chittagong Hill Tracts of what is now Bangladesh, and even managed to remain free and independent before the British takeover.  

The plains of Tripura, however, fell to the attacks from Mughals. The plains territories comprise today's South-East Dhaka and Comilla areas. While the plains areas were thus Islamized, the Hills of Tripura served as a continuous bulwark against penetration to the East. The Tripura Hill Kings were major sponsors of Hindu traditions and customs. In the modern age, they are remembered as one of the longest and most stable dynasties from the Indian East.                                                        
  
Dhanya Manikya (reigned 1463 to 1515) expanded Twipra's territorial domain well into Eastern Bengal. Rangamati was renamed Udaipur after Udai Manikya. The kingdom flourished in the 16th and 17th centuries with kings such as Govinda Manikya putting up a strong  defence against the pressure of the Muslim kingdoms to the west. However, the plains areas fell away from Tripura state due to the actions of a renegade Tripuri prince who was backed by Mughal governors of Eastern Bengal plains. After this, plains Twipra became a separate Mughal client kingdom, with the Mughal rulers exerting influence on the appointment of its kings. However, the Mughals could never penetrate the Hills territories to the east.

British India

The princely state of Tripura existed outside British India, in a subsidiary alliance with it, and was a self-governing area known as Hill Tippera, the present-day state of Tripura. However, the kings retained an estate known as Tippera district of the British Bengal Presidency or Chakla Roshanbad, which after the partition of India became part of the greater Comilla region of Bangladesh.

Bir Chandra Manikya (1862–1896) modelled his administration on the pattern of British India, and enacted reforms including the formation of Agartala Municipal Corporation. The last king was Kirit Bikram Kishore, son of Bir Bikram Kishore Debbarma, who ruled for two years, 1947–1949. In 1949, Tripura became part of the Republic of India. The Tripuri "heir apparent" is Kirat Pradyot Kishore Manikya Debbarma (born 1978), the son of the last king, who is sometimes given the courtesy title of "Maharaja".

See also
 History of Tripura
 Tripura (princely state)
 Tripuri people

Notes

References

 
 
 

 Tripura Buranji 17th Century Ahom Chronicle.
 Progressive Tripura, 1930
 Rajmala, royal chronicle of Tripura Kings.
 Hill Tippera – History The Imperial Gazetteer of India, 1909, v. 13, p. 118.

Further reading

 Online Books and material
Tripura Rajmala (1850) by Rev. James Long

External links
 Information on the kingdom of Tripura at the University of Queensland
 About Tippera District Present day Comilla District of Bangladesh

History of Tripura
Kings of Tripura
Empires and kingdoms of India
Former monarchies of Asia
History of Bengal
Kingdoms of Northeast India